Canadian Committee for the Theory of Machines and Mechanisms (CCToMM) is the Canadian branch of the International Federation for the Promotion of Mechanism and Machine Science (IFToMM).  As the IFToMM, the CCToMM is an organization that supports the exchange of researchers and engineers from a wide range of disciplines related to Mechanical Engineering.

Mission
To promote research and development in the field of Machines and Mechanisms by theoretical and experimental methods, along with their practical application.

History
Since its inception in 1971, CCToMM has grown to become an important part of the fabric of Canadian research in the theory of mechanisms and machines (TMM). CCToMM was founded by M.O.M. Osman, Professor of mechanical engineering at Concordia University in Montreal. The committee was fully formed and operating on time for the ASME DETC 1976, which took place in Montreal.  The CCToMM became affiliated with the IFToMM in 1979 and has been a regular member organisation since.

The CCToMM has served the TMM community in both Canadian official languages. For example, presentations at CCToMM symposia are welcome in both the French and English languages.

The succession of CCToMM Presidents is as follows:
 Professor M.O.M. Osman (1971-1992), Concordia University;
 Professor Jorge Angeles (1992-1996), McGill University;
 Professor Louis Cloutier (1996-1999), Université Laval;
 Dr. Jean-Claude Piedboeuf (1999-2003), Canadian Space Agency;
 Professor Ronald Podhorodeski (2003-2011) University of Victoria;
 Professor M. John D. Hayes (2011-2019) Carleton University;
 Professor Scott B. Nokleby (since 2019) Ontario Tech University;

Meetings and events
CCToMM Annual General Meeting - once a year (normally during the CCToMM M³ Symposium) 
CCToMM Mechanisms, Machines and Mechatronics (CCToMM M³ Symposium) - every year since 1999 

The CCToMM M³ Symposium is a single-track conference covering subjects in the areas of Mechanisms, Machines and Mechatronics, thus its name CCToMM M³. During even-numbered years, the symposium is held within the CSME Congress (formerly known as the CSME Forum) while on odd-numbered years, the symposium is organised as a stand-alone event most often held in Montreal, Quebec.

See also
 International Federation for the Promotion of Mechanism and Machine Science

References

External links 
 Official CCToMM website
 Official IFToMM website
 Canadian Society for Mechanical Engineering (CSME) website
 Mechanism and Machine Theory website

Organizations established in 1971
Engineering societies based in Canada
1971 establishments in Canada